Monna Rosa is the title of two oil paintings by Dante Gabriel Rossetti, both portraits of Frances Leyland, the wife of shipping magnate Frederick Richards Leyland, a regular patron of Rossetti. The earlier and smaller painting was completed in 1862 and its whereabouts is now unknown. The second was completed in 1867 and is now in a private collection.

Frederick Leyland displayed the larger painting in his drawing room with five other Rossetti "stunners."

Painting
Rossetti wrote to Frederick Leyland about the painting on 18 June 1867:

  
Rossetti asked Leyland to return the painting for reworking and soon finished on 3 December 1873 at Kelmscott.

About the time Rossetti was painting Monna Rosa, he introduced James Abbott McNeill Whistler to Leyland.  Monna Rosa's peacock background and blue and white Chinese porcelain are similar to the themes in The Peacock Room that Whistler later created for Leyland.

Henry Currie Marillie describe the painting in 1904 as a "small but pretty picture" and a "study in beautiful colour." Red and gold highlight the roses, Leyland's dress, jewellery, and hair, as well as the flower pot and peacock screen in the background. Linda Merrill is less dismissive, writing that the painting is

In another modern view, Jessica Feldman stresses the blue and white Chinese pot "that has become the emblem of aestheticism itself."  The pot should not be viewed as simply decorative, but reflects the textures of the dress, roses and screen. It recalls Rossetti's collector's passion for oriental ware and even his penchant for translation – in this case translating a Chinese pot to an English painting.

Monna Rosa was among the first of eighteen paintings Leyland commissioned from Rossetti, not counting unfulfilled commissions. Soon after acquiring the painting, they explored the idea of a Rossetti triptych, which was eventually formed with Mnemosyne, The Blessed Damozel, and Proserpine. Three additional Rossetti painting were then hung in Leyland's drawing room, all of which Leyland called "stunners."

References

Sources

Further reading
 Surtees, Virginia. Dante Gabriel Rossetti. 2 vols. Oxford: Clarendon Press, 1971.

Paintings by Dante Gabriel Rossetti
1862 paintings
1867 paintings